In enzymology, a Prostaglandin-A1 Δ-isomerase is an enzyme that catalyzes the chemical reaction

(13E)-(15S)-15-hydroxy-9-oxoprosta-10,13-dienoate  (13E)-(15S)-15-hydroxy-9-oxoprosta-11,13-dienoate

Hence, this enzyme has one substrate, (13E)-(15S)-15-hydroxy-9-oxoprosta-10,13-dienoate (Prostaglandin A1 or PGA1), and one product, (13E)-(15S)-15-hydroxy-9-oxoprosta-11,13-dienoate (Prostaglandin C1).

This enzyme belongs to the family of isomerases, specifically those intramolecular oxidoreductases transposing C=C bonds.  The systematic name of this enzyme class is (13E)-(15S)-15-hydroxy-9-oxoprosta-10,13-dienoate Delta10-Delta11-isomerase. This enzyme is also called prostaglandin A isomerase.

References

 

EC 5.3.3
Enzymes of unknown structure